The Real Story of Happy Birthday to You is a French Canadian children's animated short film directed by Gerald Potterton as part of The Real Story of... / Favorite Songs animated anthology series. The short was produced by Cinar and France Animation in association with Crayon Animation and Western Publishing and was released in January 1992 in the United States. It also features the voices of Ed Asner and Roger Daltrey.

Plot
The story involves neglected child Olivia, whose only friends are Charlie the Horse and Barnaby the Stablehand. Olivia wants her own special birthday song, but her evil caretaker tries to keep her from hearing it.

Cast
 Ed Asner as Charlie
 Roger Daltrey as Barnaby
 Sonja Ball as Olivia
 A.J. Henderson as Chef Henri
 Liz MacRae as Maid
 Judi Richards as Maid
 Carlyle Miller as Gardener
 Dan Lebel as Gardener
 Tony Robinow as Lord O/Snitchgrovel 
 Paula Harding Howe as Lady O

Production
The film was produced in 1991.

Czechoslovakian-born Canadian composer Milan Kymlicka provided the music for the film. He has also composed music for other Canadian TV series such as Babar, Rupert, The Busy World of Richard Scarry, The Legend of White Fang, The Adventures of Paddington Bear, the 1997 version of Lassie, Alfred Hitchcock Presents, Night Hood and The Neverending Story.

Songs
 The Girlie Wants a Song
 Music by Milan Kymlicka, Lyrics by Gerald Potterton
 The Birthday Contest Medley
 Music by Milan Kymlicka, Lyrics by Gerald Potterton
 Happy Birthday to You
 Used by permission Warner Bros. Music, Written by Patty Hill and Mildred J. Hill

Broadcast
The film was first broadcast on CTV Television Network and then on Family Channel and Showcase in Canada and later on HBO in the USA. It has also been airing on Cartoon Network and the BBC in the UK, RTB in Brunei, ABC TV in Australia, ATV World in Hong Kong, M-Net and SABC1 in South Africa, RTÉ in the Republic of Ireland, Prime 12, Premiere 12 and Channel 5 in Singapore, TPI in Indonesia, TV1 in Malaysia, BFBS and SSVC Television in Germany, Arutz HaYeladim in Israel and Channel 2 in New Zealand. All twenty channels have aired it along with all the other animated short films in The Real Story of... / Favorite Songs series.

Home media
It was first released on video by Golden Book Video and later Sony Wonder in the USA and released again by ABC Video and Roadshow Entertainment. The Australian release also contained another short film The Real Story of Twinkle, Twinkle Little Star which featured the voices of Vanna White and Martin Short.

References

1992 short films
1992 films
Canadian animated short films
Films directed by Gerald Potterton
Films based on songs
1990s animated short films
1990s English-language films
1990s Canadian films